Six Mile and Sixmile may refer to:

Communities
Sixmile (Bibb county), Alabama
Six Mile (Morgan County), Alabama
Six Mile, Georgia
Six Mile, South Carolina, Pickens County
Six Mile Township, Franklin County, Illinois
Six Mile Bottom, England
Six Mile Grove Township, Swift County, Minnesota
Six Mile, Papua New Guinea
Six Mile, Lae, Papua New Guinea
Hayden, Indiana, also known as Six Mile

Other
Six Mile Water, a river in Northern Ireland
Six Mile Bottom railway station, England
Six Mile Grove, a band

See also
Six Mile Creek (disambiguation)
Six Mile Island (disambiguation)
Six Mile Lake (disambiguation)
Six Mile Run (disambiguation)